W.W. and the Dixie Dancekings is a 1975 American comedy film directed by John G. Avildsen, starring Burt Reynolds, and written by Thomas Rickman.  The 20th Century Fox film features the acting debut of Jerry Reed.

Plot
In 1957, W.W. Bright (Burt Reynolds) is an easygoing crook who robs only SOS ("Southland Oil System") gas stations. He meets the Dixie Dancekings, a country music band, while fleeing from a policeman. Dixie (Conny Van Dyke), their singer, gives him an alibi. He claims to be in the music business, and ends up promoting the group. Wayne (Jerry Reed), the band's leader, does not trust him, but the others all have faith in him.

The SOS chairman sends for Bible-thumping ex-lawman Deacon John Wesley Gore (Art Carney) to catch W.W. Meanwhile, W.W. and the newly outfitted band go to see Country Bull Jenkins (Ned Beatty), a highly successful singer-songwriter. He is willing to write them a song for $1,000.

W.W. talks the Dancekings into a bank robbery (SOS has just expanded into the banking business) that does not work out quite as planned. When Gore broadcasts the description of the getaway car on a radio revival show, W.W. burns up his rare, distinctive car (see "Golden Anniversary" Oldsmobile subsection below).

He is ready to separate from the Dancekings in order to shield them, but then he hears them rehearsing Wayne's new song. He persuades Country Bull to listen to it; the man is so impressed, he puts them on the Grand Ole Opry radio show. There, Gore catches W.W., using an exact replica of his burnt car as bait. Gore makes him drive to the police station, but just as they arrive, Gore realizes it is now Sunday, so rather than violate the Sabbath, he lets him go (with the car).

Cast
 Burt Reynolds as W.W. Bright
 Conny Van Dyke as Dixie
 Jerry Reed as Wayne
 Ned Beatty as Country Bull Jenkins
 James Hampton as Junior
 Don Williams as Leroy
 Rick Hurst as Butterball
 Mel Tillis as GOB
 Furry Lewis as Uncle Furry
 Art Carney as Deacon John Wesley Gore

Production

Development
Burt Reynolds was originally going to make the film with Dick Richards in late 1972. However, he dropped it to do The Man Who Loved Cat Dancing.

In January 1974, Reynolds signed to do the movie, and filming started in February 1974 in Nashville. Reynolds approved John Avildsen on the basis of a recommendation from Jack Lemmon, who had worked with the director on Save the Tiger.

John Avildsen says Sylvester Stallone auditioned for a supporting role. He did not get the job, but starred in Rocky, the director's next film.

Reynolds wanted Dolly Parton to play the female lead. She declined; the two later worked together on The Best Little Whorehouse in Texas.

Filming was marked by tension between Reynolds and Avildsen. The two men did not get along professionally or personally, and there were often clashes in approach and temperament.

"Golden Anniversary" Oldsmobile

One of the central props in the movie is the car that W.W. drives. In the film, it is described as a special 1955 "Golden Anniversary" Oldsmobile Rocket 88, of which only 50 were purportedly made. It is a four-door sedan painted gold with black hood and side accents and chrome trim. In reality, there was no such special model, and in any event, 1955 was not the 50th anniversary of Oldsmobile.

Three such cars were custom-built for the film from stock 1955 Oldsmobiles. One was destroyed in the fire scene, one was taken to a museum, and the third was used as the camera car, with the roof removed. Radio Shack in California had a promotional giveaway for the third car shortly after the movie was released. The Radio Shack connection is that Burt Reynolds and the Bandit movies created a demand for CB radios, which amounted to 30% of Radio Shack's sales during the height of the craze.

Reception

Critical reception
Vincent Canby of The New York Times enjoyed the film:

Roger Ebert of the Chicago Sun-Times gave the film two stars out of four.

Box office
The film earned North American rentals of $8 million. It was one of the studio's biggest films of the year.

When the film aired on U.S. TV in January 1977, it was the second highest rated show of the week.

Burt Reynolds
Reynolds said the film "turned out wrong but it made a lot of money. It was supposed to be a special, warm and lovely little film. It was important that we not make fun of the people in Nashville as opposed to Nashville. It wasn't that kind of movie. It was a bouquet to Nashville. But I got into a lot of fights with the director."

Nonetheless, Reynolds liked Jerry Reed's performance so much he later cast Reed in his first film as director, Gator (1976).

Legacy
Quentin Tarantino credited the novelization of the film as getting him interested in writing. He bought the novelization and would read it every few years. Tarantino said in 2003:

I found out later that Thomas Rickman was so disgusted with what they did with his movie that he asked to write the novelization, so that one person out there would know what it was that he intended. I'm 40 now, and I still read W. W. and the Dixie Dancekings every three years. I'm that one person. When I saw the movie, though, a few years after I'd first read the book, I was like, What the hell is this? I mean, I was offended. I was literally offended. The novelization was pure. But this was Hollywood garbage. So that's why I started writing screenplays, because I was so outraged.

See also
 List of American films of 1975

References

External links 
 
W.W. and the Dixie Dancekings at TCMDB
 
 

1975 films
1970s crime comedy films
20th Century Fox films
American crime comedy films
Country music films
Films scored by Dave Grusin
Films about automobiles
Films directed by John G. Avildsen
Films set in 1957
Films set in Tennessee
Films shot in Tennessee
American comedy road movies
1970s comedy road movies
1970s chase films
1975 comedy films
1970s English-language films
1970s American films